Taraxacoside is an acylated γ-butyrolactone glycoside with the molecular formula C18H22O10 which has been isolated from roots of the plant Taraxacum officinale.

References

Further reading 

 

Glycosides
Tetrahydrofurans
Phenyl compounds